The infanta Maria Theresa of Spain or The infanta Maria Theresa aged 14 is a 1653 portrait by Diego Velázquez of Maria Theresa of Spain, then about thirteen years. It has been cut down at the top and bottom and is now in the Kunsthistorisches Museum in Vienna. 

It is considered one of the strongest of artist' late portraits, showing its subject in a majestic pose, illuminated in a light dress against a dark background. Its seriousness and formality is added to by the two watches she carries, whilst the handkerchief in her left hand is one of the painting's highlights.

Velázquez and his assistants created three paintings to be sent to potential husbands for the Infanta (who eventually married Louis XIV). Two other versions are on display in the Museum of Fine Arts, Boston and the Louvre.

Notes

Sources
Museo del Prado. Pintura española de los siglos XVI y XVII. Enrique Lafuente Ferrari. Aguilar S.A. 1964
 Gállego, Julián. Velázquez. New York: Metropolitan Museum of Art; H.N. Abrams, 1989

1653 paintings
Maria Theresa of Spain
Maria Theresa of Spain
Maria Theresa of Spain
Louis XIV
Philip IV of Spain
Maria Theresa